Mass Appeal is a 1984 American comedy-drama directed by Glenn Jordan and starring Jack Lemmon. The screenplay by Bill C. Davis is based on his 1980 play of the same name.

Plot
For years, as pastor of an affluent, suburban Catholic parish, Father Tim Farley has maintained a close relationship with his congregation by delivering folksy homilies filled with practical advice and adhering to clerical policies without waver. One Sunday, his sermon is interrupted by seminarian Mark Dolson, who questions Farley's position on the ordination of women. The older priest charmingly sidesteps the young man but is annoyed that he was placed in an uncomfortable position. This is a man who relies on charm, harmless white lies, and inane jokes when interacting with his parishioners, and he always has been careful not to get involved in controversial issues.

Dolson defends two seminarians who were expelled after being suspected of engaging in a homosexual relationship. After he is ordained a deacon, frustrated Monsignor Thomas Burke assigns him to Farley's parish in the hope the older man will inspire him to toe the line and become more complacent. Although in some ways conservative—he criticizes his sister Liz for her affair with a married man—the young man primarily is a liberal firebrand who is anxious to make changes in the church, whereas Farley prefers  study with a bottle of alcohol and not make waves.

The pastor tries to become a mentor to his new charge, but Dolson ignores the priest's efforts to teach him the necessity of tact. He enrages the congregation with his first, highly critical sermon.

Questions as to why Dolson defended the gay seminarians arise. He confides having spent two years engaging in sexual relations with both men and women, saying he now is committed to celibacy. Farley urges him to keep quiet about his past, but the deacon admits his secret to the monsignor and is expelled.

Farley promises to convince his followers that the church needs liberal thinkers who do not always do things by the book. As soon as he senses he is losing support, however, the priest backs down. Dolson angrily confronts him with a feeling of betrayal, forcing Farley to rethink his position and do the right thing, even if it means the loss of his parish.

Cast
Jack Lemmon - Father Tim Farley
Željko Ivanek - Deacon Mark Dolson
Charles Durning - Monsignor Thomas Burke
Louise Latham - Margaret
Talia Balsam - Liz Dolson

Critical reception
Janet Maslin of The New York Times compared the film to Educating Rita, although she found it to be "less strident . . . and more prone to dry humor." She added, "The momentum of Mr. Davis's drama and the stars' intensity are enough to sustain interest, even when Glenn Jordan's television-style direction seems excessively bland. The casting of the two key roles works in the long run, but it initially seems a shade off. Father Farley, as written, is rather too self-satisfied and facile for the priesthood, qualities better emphasized in Milo O'Shea's stage performance than in Mr. Lemmon's on film, since the character's glibness comes too close to the actor's usual screen persona. And Mr. Ivanek, beginning on a note of intelligence and severity, later has moments of surprisingly callowness, even petulance. But the stars work together very effectively, making the story's progress believable as each of their characters evolves into a better man. Mass Appeal doesn't have to tug too hard at the audience's heartstrings to arrive at its simple and satisfying resolution."

References

External links

1984 films
1984 comedy-drama films
1984 LGBT-related films
American comedy-drama films
American LGBT-related films
Films scored by Bill Conti
Films about Catholic priests
Films about Catholicism
American films based on plays
Films directed by Glenn Jordan
Universal Pictures films
LGBT-related comedy-drama films
1980s English-language films
1980s American films